Elm Court is a former Vanderbilt mansion located on Old Stockbridge Road, straddling the town line between Lenox and Stockbridge, Massachusetts. It is listed on the National Register of Historic Places and until July 2012 was owned and operated as a hotel by descendants of the original owners.

Elm Court was built as the Berkshire summer home of William Douglas Sloane and Emily Thorn Vanderbilt, a member of the wealthy American Vanderbilt family. Designed by premier architectural firm Peabody and Stearns, with gardens and landscape design by Frederick Law Olmsted, Elm Court is the largest Shingle style house in the United States, with 106 rooms.

Commercial use, decline and restoration

Owners Colonel Helm George Wilde and his wife Marjorie Field Wilde (great-great-granddaughter of William H. Vanderbilt) opened Elm Court in 1948 as an Inn (Elm Court Club, Inc.) with an accommodation for up to 60 people. Dancing and dinner open to the public Saturday nights made for a popular spot for many years. Knott Hotels Corporation were retained as the operators of the Inn.

The Wildes - who also owned the neighboring  High Lawn manor (designed by Delano and Aldrich) and farm - pursued the Inn concept in order to preserve the estate and provide summer employment for the area's many teachers. The Inn eventually faltered and due to overwhelming operational costs the house shuttered in 1957.

While some fine furnishings were removed the house was largely left merely locked up but intact as it had been in the 1950s. Unoccupied, secluded, and only lightly patrolled it fell prey over the years to massive vandalism, outright looting, some arson, and a general derelict state by the end of the 20th century. The massive elm tree on the grounds for which the property was named died in the early 1960s of disease.

Upon the death of George Wilde in 1998 the Elm Court passed to his daughter Lila Wilde Berle of Stockbridge. Lila's husband, Peter A. A. Berle (1937–2007), was a highly respected environmentalist, New York State assemblyman, commissioner of the State Department of Environmental Conservation and president of the National Audubon Society She in turn sold the estate in 1999 to her son, Robert Berle, great-great-grandson of the Sloanes, and his wife, Sonya, for just under $1 million. They undertook a major restoration effort, repairing original details and adding new wiring, plumbing, heating, and opened the property as a luxury Inn while portions of the home remained a work in progress with restoration.

By comparison the highest price for any Berkshire County property sold was recorded January, 2007 for Southmayd Farm for $6.9 million

The property was reduced to an asking price of $17.5 million in July 2006 and a contract was signed for sale to a Florida-based hotel business ('The Kessler Collection') however that deal fell through and was mutually terminated by both parties. Last listed at $14 million, it was taken off the market at the end of 2006.

As of August 2009 the property was taken off the market.

In the Spring of 2010 the Town of Stockbridge approved a permit for an 18-room hotel in the mansion. The Town of Lenox approved a sign permit for the property in the summer of 2010. These permits are in addition to the restaurant permit for the original horse Stable, already in place. (Town of Stockbridge, MA; Board of Selectmen Special Permit Hearing January 6, 2003).

New roofs have been installed on the Butler's Cottage, the Gardner's Cottage, Stable and other support buildings at the estate. A new septic system for the entire property has been installed.

The frontage of the property has been cleared of brush and invasive plant species. The Mansion and other buildings can now be viewed from Old Stockbridge Road, as well as the lake in the distance.

Commercial sale in 2012; ending the last of the Berkshire cottages held by family

In July 2012 it was announced that the property in its entirety (55,000-square foot mansion on 44 acres) was sold to a Colorado-based group for $9.8 million. That is believed to be the highest price paid for a residential property in Berkshire County history.

Elm Court Realty LLC, which includes the property's longtime owners, Robert and Sonya Berle, sold Elm Court to Front Yard LLC of Denver, according to documents on file at the Middle Berkshire Registry of Deeds. The Berles have retained a small percentage of ownership in the property.

Elm Court had been the last of the Berkshire cottages to have remained in the family of its original owners. Robert Berle is a descendant of William Douglas Sloane and Emily Vanderbilt.

A $50 million renovation of the property was due to take place in 2020.   The property is again for sale as of November 2020.

External media: video

In 2004 Bob Vila's television show 'Home Again' did a multi-segment visit to Elm Court with the Berle family.

BVTV - Home Again 'Introducing Elm Court' 3 min 46 sec

See also
 Berkshire Cottages
 Vanderbilt houses
 National Register of Historic Places listings in Berkshire County, Massachusetts
 Peabody and Stearns
 Frederick Law Olmsted

References
Notes

Sources
 Elm Court History
  Helm George Wilde October 8, 1907- June 18, 1998
  'To The Manor Born' (Lila Wilde Berle)
 Forbes August 22, 2005 'House of the Week: Lavish Lenox Estate'
  Berkshire Eagle December 29, 2007 'Stockbridge Estate Fetches $3.2 million
 Berkshire Eagle July 20, 2006 '$21M estate deal is ditched'
  New York Times November 5, 2007 'Peter A. A. Berle, Lawmaker and Conservationist, Dies at 69 '
  Luxist August 12, 2005 "Elm Court"
  Stonehouse Properties listing 310 Old Stockbridge Road
  Elm Court, Feb 2009, Stone House Properties listing
  Berkshire Eagle, July 17, 2012 "$9.8 million for Elm Court"

External links
 Elm Court Official website

Buildings and structures in Lenox, Massachusetts
Peabody and Stearns buildings
Vanderbilt family residences
Shingle Style houses
Houses in Berkshire County, Massachusetts
Houses on the National Register of Historic Places in Berkshire County, Massachusetts
Gilded Age
Tudor Revival architecture in Massachusetts
Shingle Style architecture in Massachusetts
Gilded Age mansions